The Arkansas Soccer Association is the governing body of soccer in the state of Arkansas. The organization was established in 1979 and the current executive director is Jim Walker.

References

External links 

 Arkansas Soccer Association official site

State Soccer Associations
Soccer in Arkansas
1979 establishments in Arkansas
Organizations based in Sherwood, Arkansas
Sports organizations established in 1979